Aleksey Zhuravlyov may refer to:

 Aleksey Zhuravlyov (politician) (born 1962), Russian politician, head of Rodina (political party)
 Aleksey Zhuravlyov (footballer) (born 1980), Russian football player